Amblydoras is a genus of thorny catfishes native to rivers in tropical South America.

Amblydoras is one of several genera classified within the subfamily Astrodoradinae.

Amblydoras species range from about 7.5–10.2 centimetres (3.0–4.0 in) SL.

Species 
There are currently five recognized species in this genus:
 Amblydoras affinis (Kner, 1855)
 Amblydoras bolivarensis (Fernández-Yépez, 1968)
 Amblydoras gonzalezi (Fernández-Yépez, 1968)
 Amblydoras monitor (Cope, 1872)
 Amblydoras nauticus (Cope, 1874)

References

Doradidae
Fish of South America
Taxa named by Pieter Bleeker
Catfish genera
Freshwater fish genera